Clank (real name: XJ-0461 or Defect B5429671)  is one of the titular game characters and the secondary protagonist in the Ratchet & Clank video game series by Insomniac Games and PlayStation.

Character design
XJ-0461, originally designated Defect B5429671 (a sentry-bot in the original game, or a warbot in the re-imagined continuity), nicknamed Clank, is an escaped robot from Chairman Drek's robot plant on planet Quartu. After a high-speed chase, he crashes near a plateau on planet Veldin and catalyzes Ratchet's adventure. Clank is charming in nature and has many attachments including a helipack, thrusterpack, and hydropack. Under certain circumstances, he can grow into a giant form to fight much larger enemies. He is mostly used as a character for tight spaces or areas in outer space, since he does not require oxygen.

Clank spawned from an early idea involving a number of small robots attached to Ratchet, which would perform different functions. However, Insomniac realized that having the three robots was both complicated and created confusion about Ratchet's appearance, leading them to have only one robot, Clank. However, in later games the smaller robots appeared in sections where the player could control Clank, and they had various functions such as attacking and activating doors.

Appearances
Clank is a main character in the Ratchet & Clank series, first appearing in the game with the same name as an escaped robot. After meeting up with Ratchet, they travel various planets trying to stop the goals of Chairmen Drek, and looking for Captain Qwark to help them. Along the way, Ratchet keeps drifting from the goals that Clank wants to accomplish, causing him to get upset with Ratchet's selfishness. With Clank being the only way Ratchet can pilot his ship, he makes up with him, and gets back on track. In Ratchet & Clank: Going Commando, they are living the lives of heroes and get a call from the CEO of Megacorp, wanting them to help retrieve a dangerous prototype which was stolen. In Ratchet & Clank: Up Your Arsenal, Ratchet and Clank help Captain Qwark defeat his past nemesis, Dr. Nefarious. Meanwhile, Clank is shown to be a movie star, acting as Secret Agent Clank (a PlayStation Portable game was released under the same name, and focuses on the adventures of Clank under this role). A great deal of new information regarding Clank's real origins is shown in the Future trilogy. During the events of Ratchet & Clank Future: Tools of Destruction, Clank is often visited by mysterious beings known as the Zoni and is warned that he faces some difficult decisions regarding his adventures with Ratchet. Clank is eventually taken away by the Zoni at the end of the game. In Ratchet & Clank Future: A Crack in Time, Clank is transported to the Great Clock where he learns that his creator is, in fact, a powerful Zoni named Orvus (his alternate name is also quoted as XJ-0461) and fulfils his intended purpose as Senior Caretaker of the Clock. After the final battle, Clank is left with a hard decision on whether to continue partnering Ratchet or leave him and stay at the Clock, but he ultimately decides to leave the Clock and stay with Ratchet.

Clank is one of the six playable characters in PlayStation Move Heroes, and creates a rivalry with Sly Cooper character Bentley due to both of them having high intelligence. Both Ratchet and Clank also appear as one playable character in the crossover fighting game PlayStation All-Stars Battle Royale. Clank appears as a playable character with Ratchet in Mediatonic's Fall Guys. Clank also appears as a non-playable character in Hot Shots Golf Fore! and the PlayStation 4 version of Super Bomberman R. Clank makes a cameo appearance in Astro's Playroom.

Reception
Douglass C. Perry of IGN described David Kaye's vocal performance as Clank in the original game as "quite engaging, and in some cases, charming, especially when he finishes a level or gains a weapon." Gavin Frankle of Allgame found it hard to form an emotional bond with Ratchet or Clank, saying that Clank is "the stereotypical intellectual; stuffy and almost prudish to a fault". Benjamin Turner of GameSpy, after criticizing Ratchet, cited that Clank was "the complete opposite" of Ratchet and wished that the game was named after him instead of Ratchet. Johnny Liu of Game Revolution compared Clank to GIR of Invader Zim and C-3PO of the Star Wars franchise, and analyzed him as "the straight man to Ratchet's jokes, offering clueless intellectualism to contrast Ratchet's acid-tongue humor." Clank's "awkward robot laugh" was described by Carlos McElfish of GameZone as "impossibly cute". Jeremy Dunham of IGN said that Clank's "dry sidekick humor is in great contrast to Jak's own sidekick Daxter".

GamesRadar listed Clank on their list of "The 25 best new characters of the decade", describing him as a "quiet, collected and effortlessly charming robot with cool powers and cooler personality". Clank was named the 5th "Best Sidekick" by IGN, calling him "a true pal, and an obviously cool sidekick.". UGO.com listed Clank on their list of "The Cutest Video Game Characters" stating "Everyone wants a tiny robot to follow them around and do stuff for them". They also listed him as one of their favourite video game robots. Game Informer called him the 3rd greatest wingman of the past decade, saying he "is often a more interesting character" and that "Clank's unique personality shines through it all, giving as much of a reason for players to come back as Ratchet's explosive gunplay."

References

Anthropomorphic video game characters
Fictional explorers in video games
Extraterrestrial superheroes
Extraterrestrial characters in video games
Fictional actors
Fictional characters who can manipulate time
Fictional extraterrestrial robots
Fighting game characters
Male characters in video games
Ratchet & Clank characters
Robot characters in video games
Robot superheroes
Sony Interactive Entertainment protagonists
Video game characters introduced in 2002
Video game mascots
Video game sidekicks
sv:Ratchet & Clank (spelserie)#Clank